Carlos A. Bertulani  is a Brazilian and American theoretical physicist and professor at the department of physics of the Texas A&M University-Commerce. He graduated, PhD, at University of Bonn and works on nuclear physics and nuclear astrophysics. He was formerly a professor at the Federal University of Rio de Janeiro from 1980-2000.

Research
Bertulani's thesis work on electromagnetic processes in relativistic heavy ion collisions is often taken as the standard reference for gamma-nucleus and gamma-gamma physics in collisions with heavy nuclei. Numerous processes related to lepton-pair (e.g., e+e−, or quark-antiquark) production, and to meson production in Peripheral nuclear collisions  were first discussed and proposed in his thesis. The excitation of multiple giant resonances (i.e., a giant resonance on top of another) in nuclei  was also a prediction of his thesis work. The excitation of multiple dipole resonances were verified in experiments at the Gesellschaft für Schwerionenforschung (GSI), Germany. The Coulomb dissociation method was another product of his earlier work as a doctoral student, in 1986. This method is now used in several nuclear accelerators worldwide to extract information on radiative capture processes in stars, which often cannot be measured directly.

His APS Fellowship citation is:

Bertulani works on the physics of nuclei far from the stability line, e.g. halo nuclei; he has contributed to pioneering theoretical articles on the subject, as far back as 1986, on the nature of the 11Li nucleus.  He has co-authored the first theoretical review of reactions with rare nuclear isotopes in 1993 and the first textbook in 2002.  Bertulani has published textbooks on nuclear physics and nuclear astrophysics, and edited books of international conferences that he organized. He is often involved in popularizing science, e.g. a feature article on Physics Today, March 1994.

He was a recipient of the John Simon Guggenheim Memorial Foundation fellowship in 2000-2001, an APS Fellow in 2012  and the Fulbright Scholarship in 2014.

Teaching
Bertulani has taught more than 75 courses at the undergraduate and graduate level at universities in Brazil, United States and Germany. He has advised  PhD  and MSc students  and mentored undergraduate students. Bertulani was chair of the PhD program at the Federal University of Rio de Janeiro for 3 years. He participated and chaired committees on education and graduate student fellowships for the CNPq, Coordenadoria de Aperfeiçoamento de Pessoal de Nível Superior, National Science Foundation, and chaired (2015-2016) of the Committee of Education for the American Physical Society.

Family
Bertulani's youngest son Daniel was a member of the United States Air Force. He died in September 2012. Daniel's body is interred at the Beaufort National Cemetery in South Carolina.

Bertulani's older son Henrique is an artist and graduated as an anthropologist from Michigan State University. Henrique's paintings are present in several countries and were exhibited in galleries and art centers such as the Eisemann Center for Performing Arts, Dallas, Texas.

Publications

Selected scientific publications
 https://scholar.google.com/scholar?oi=bibs&hl=en&q=bertulani
 https://inspirehep.net/authors/1016514
 Electromagnetic Processes in Relativistic Heavy Ion Collisions, C.A.Bertulani and G.Baur, Phys. Reports 163 (1988) 29.
 Coulomb Dissociation as a Source of Information on Radioactive Capture Processes of Astrophysical Interest, G.Baur, C.A.Bertulani and H.Rebel, Nucl. Phys. A458 (1986) 188.
 The Structure and Reactions of Neutron-Rich Nuclei, C.A. Bertulani, L.F. Canto and M.S. Hussein, Physics Reports 226 (1993) 281.
 Relativistic Heavy Ion Physics without Nuclear Contact, C.A. Bertulani and G. Baur, Physics Today, March 1994, p. 22.
 Microscopic studies of the double giant resonance, C.A. Bertulani and V. Ponomarev, Phys. Reports 321 (1999) 139.
 Physics of ultraperipheral relativistic nuclear collisions, C.A. Bertulani, S. Klein and J. Nystrand, Annu. Rev. Nuc. Part. Sci. 55 (2005) 271.
 Nuclear Astrophysics with Radioactive Beams, C.A. Bertulani and A. Gade, Physics Reports 485, 195 (2010).
 Indirect methods in nuclear astrophysics with relativistic radioactive beams, Thomas Aumann and Carlos A. Bertulani, Progress in Particle and Nuclear Physics 112, 103753 (2020).

Textbooks

References

External links
 Bertulani's web page at Texas A&M-Commerce
 Department of Physics and Astronomy at Texas A&M university-Commerce

Brazilian scientists
Living people
Year of birth missing (living people)
Texas A&M University–Commerce faculty
University of Bonn alumni
Brazilian expatriate academics in the United States